Hans Albrecht, Hereditary Prince of Schleswig-Holstein-Sonderburg-Glücksburg, from 1931 onwards, of Schleswig-Holstein (12 May 1917, Schloss Louisenlund, Schleswig, Schleswig-Holstein, Germany – 10 August 1944, Jedlińsk, General Government, Germany) was the Hereditary Prince of Schleswig-Holstein and the heir apparent to the Head of the House of Oldenburg. Hans Albrecht was the eldest son of Wilhelm Friedrich, Duke of Schleswig-Holstein and his wife Princess Marie Melita of Hohenlohe-Langenburg. The Hereditary Prince fought in the Second World War between 1939 and 1944 when he died from wounds received in action near Jedlińsk, Poland.

References

Princes of Schleswig-Holstein-Sonderburg-Glücksburg
1917 births
1944 deaths
People from Schleswig, Schleswig-Holstein
Heirs apparent who never acceded
German military personnel killed in World War II
Military personnel from Schleswig-Holstein